Joshua Gordon Silverman (born 1969) is an American entrepreneur and technology executive currently serving as chief executive officer of Etsy. He is known for co-founding the invitation website Evite and serving as CEO of Skype (2008–10) and shopping.com (2006–08).

Early life and education 
Silverman was raised in Ann Arbor, Michigan. He attended Ann Arbor's Community High School graduating in 1987. Silverman earned a Bachelor of Arts in public policy from Brown University in 1991, after which he spent two years working for New Jersey Senator Bill Bradley. In 1995 he enrolled at the Stanford Graduate School of Business; he earned his MBA from Stanford in 1997.

Career 
In November 1998, Silverman quit his job at ADAC Laboratories to work full time on building what would become Evite. Evite was acquired by Barry Diller's IAC/InterActiveCorp 2001. In 2006, Silverman became CEO of Shopping.com, a comparison-shopping engine owned by eBay. In February 2008, he was named CEO of Skype

Silverman joined the board of Etsy in November, 2016. After an activist investor took a stake in the company and called for it sale, Etsy's board ousted longtime CEO Chad Dickerson and installed Silverman as chief executive officer.

Personal life 
Silverman met his wife, Shirin in 1998; as of 2018, the couple has two children.

References 

1969 births
Living people
People from Ann Arbor, Michigan
Brown University alumni
Stanford Graduate School of Business alumni
Chief executives in the technology industry